Frederick, Fred, Freddie or Fredrick Scott may refer to:

Sportsmen
Fred Scott (footballer, born 1874) (1874–1969), Australian rules centre half-forward for Essendon and Carlton
Fred Scott (footballer, born 1885) (1885–1937), Australian rules player for Fitzroy
Freddie Scott (footballer) (1916–1995), English winger
Frederick Scott (field hockey) (born 1933), British Olympian in 1956 and 1960
Freddie Scott (American football, born 1952), American wide receiver
Freddie Scott (American football, born 1974), American wide receiver, son of above

Writers
Fred Newton Scott (1860–1931), American educator and rhetorician
Frederick George Scott (1861–1944), Canadian clergyman, poet and author
Freddie Scott (1933–2007), American singer-songwriter known for "Hey, Girl"
Fredrick D. Scott (born 1984), American financial consultant and motivational speaker

Others
Frederick A. Scott (1866–1957), American attorney and legislator in Connecticut
Fred Scott (actor) (1902–1991), American singing cowboy in western films
Freddie Scott (British Army officer) (1922–2011), British Army officer in World War II
Frederick Scott (designer) (1942–2001), English innovator and creator of Supporto chair

See also